The 73rd Texas Legislature met from January 12, 1993, to May 31, 1993. All members present during this session were elected in the 1992 general elections.

Sessions

Regular Session: January 12, 1993 - May 31, 1993

Party summary

Senate

House of Representatives

Officers

Senate
 Lieutenant Governor: Bob Bullock, Democrat
 President Pro Tempore: John T. Montford, Democrat

House
 Speaker of the House: Pete Laney, Democrat

Members

Senate

Sources
http://www.tsl.state.tx.us/ref/abouttx/holidays.html

https://lrl.texas.gov/scanned/sessionOverviews/summary/soe73.pdf (Summary of Enactments for the 73rd Legislature)

References

External links

73rd Texas Legislature
1993 in Texas
1993 U.S. legislative sessions